MN-25 (UR-12) is a drug invented by Bristol-Myers Squibb, that acts as a reasonably selective agonist of peripheral cannabinoid receptors. It has moderate affinity for CB2 receptors with a Ki of 11 nM, but 22x lower affinity for the psychoactive CB1 receptors with a Ki of 245 nM. The indole 2-methyl derivative has the ratio of affinities reversed however, with a Ki of 8 nM at CB1 and 29 nM at CB2, which contrasts with the usual trend of 2-methyl derivatives having increased selectivity for CB2 (cf. JWH-018 vs JWH-007, JWH-081 vs JWH-098).

Chemically, it is closely related to another indole-3-carboxamide synthetic cannabinoid, Org 28611, but with a different cycloalkyl substitution on the carboxamide, and the cyclohexylmethyl group replaced by morpholinylethyl, as in JWH-200 or A-796,260. Early compounds such as these have subsequently led to the development of many related indole-3-carboxamide cannabinoid ligands.

See also 
 A-834,735
 AB-001
 AM-1221
 BMS-F
 CUMYL-PEGACLONE
 JTE 7-31
 JWH-203
 MDA-19
 SR-144,528
 UR-144

References

Further reading 

 
 
 

Aminoalkylindoles
Cannabinoids
Designer drugs
Indoles
Indolecarboxamides